Muhammad Shaharyar Khan Mahar is a Pakistani politician who has been a member of the Provincial Assembly of Sindh since August 2018. He previously had served in this role from May 2013 to current time.

Early life and education
He was born on 6 February 1976 in Shikarpur.

He has a degree of Bachelor of Arts, a degree of Master of Art and a degree of Bachelor of Laws.

Political career

He was elected to the Provincial Assembly of Sindh as a candidate of Pakistan Muslim League (F) from PS-10 Shikarpur-cum-Sukkur in the 2013 Sindh provincial election.

He was re-elected to Provincial Assembly of Sindh as a candidate of the Grand Democratic Alliance (GDA) from PS-8 Shikarpur-II in the 2018 Sindh provincial election.

References

Living people
Sindh MPAs 2013–2018
1976 births
Pakistan Muslim League (F) politicians
Grand Democratic Alliance MPAs (Sindh)
Sindh MPAs 2018–2023